Smelophyllum is a genus of flowering plants belonging to the family Sapindaceae.

Its native range is South African Republic.

Species
Species:
 Smelophyllum capense Radlk.

References

Sapindaceae
Sapindaceae genera